Michael Marshall may refer to:

 Michael Marshall (bishop) (born 1936), Bishop of Woolwich
 Sir Michael Marshall (politician) (1930–2006), British politician
 Michael Marshall (singer) (born 1965), American R&B singer
 Michael Marshall (skeptic) (born 1983), British skeptical activist
 Michael Marshall (drift driver)
 Michael Marshall, pen name of Michael Marshall Smith (born 1965), British writer
 Michael Marshall, Melbourne gangland war victim, see Carl Williams

See also
 Mike Marshall (disambiguation)